The 1922 Swedish Ice Hockey Championship (Swedish: Svenska Mästerskapet) was the first ever tournament to determine a Swedish champion in ice hockey.  The tournament was held over three days (Friday to Sunday), with three-rounds, and eight participating teams. IK Göta won the finals against Hammarby IF by a score of 6–0, to become the inaugural Swedish champions in ice hockey.

Tournament

External links 
 Season on hockeyarchives.info  
 Seriespelet 1921/22 on svenskhockey.com

Champ
Swedish Ice Hockey Championship seasons